R.S. More College,  also known as Ram Sahai Mull More College, established in 1959, is a general degree college in Gobindpur, Dhanbad district, Jharkhand. It offers undergraduate courses in arts, commerce and sciences.It was awarded with "One District One Green Champion Award" in 2021 by MGNCRE. It is affiliated to  Binod Bihari Mahto Koyalanchal University.

Accreditation
R.S. More College was accredited by the National Assessment and Accreditation Council (NAAC).

See also
Education in India
Literacy in India
List of institutions of higher education in Jharkhand

References

External links
http://www.rsmorecollege.edu.in/index.php

Colleges affiliated to Binod Bihari Mahto Koyalanchal University
Education in Dhanbad district
Educational institutions established in 1959
1959 establishments in Bihar